Sturgeon County is a municipal district the Edmonton Metropolitan Region of Alberta, Canada. It is north of Edmonton and west of the North Saskatchewan River. Sturgeon County is located in Division No. 11 and was named for the Sturgeon River.

History 
In 1876, the Crown gained title to the land that would later become Sturgeon County in Treaty 6 with First Nations. The area was first settled in 1879. The first settlers were several francophone families.

The Municipal District (MD) of Sturgeon River No. 90 was originally incorporated on January 1, 1955 and became the County of Sturgeon No. 15 on January 1, 1961. It reverted back to the MD of Sturgeon No. 90 on July 12, 1965. Its name was changed to Sturgeon County on April 23, 1997.

Geography

Communities and localities 
The following urban municipalities are surrounded by Sturgeon County.

Cities
St. Albert
Towns
Bon Accord
Gibbons
Legal
Morinville
Redwater

Villages
none
Summer villages
none

The following hamlets are located within Sturgeon County.
Hamlets
Alcomdale
Calahoo
Carbondale
Cardiff
Lamoureux
Mearns
Namao
Pine Sands
Riviere Qui Barre
Villeneuve

The following localities are located within Sturgeon County.
Localities 

Amelia
Austin Acres
Banko Junction
Braun Village
Cameron Park
Cardiff-Echoes
Cardiff-Pittsburgh
Casa Vista
Clearview Acres
Coronado
Crestview Heights
Dover Estates
Dream Hollow Estates
Dream Nook
Duagh
Eastgate
Eldorena
Excelsior
Fairhaven East Subdivision
Fairhaven West Subdivision
Fairydell
Fedorah

Fort Augustus
Fort Saskatchewan Settlement
Freemore Estates
Gibbons Lea
Gibbons Station
Glenview
Glory Hills (designated place) or Glory Hills Development
Golden Heights
Grandview Heights
Greenacres Estates
Hansen Subdivision
Hanson Subdivision
Hewitt Estates (designated place)
Hillsborough Estates
Hu Haven (designated place)
Juniper Hill
Lancaster Park
Lily Lake Estates
Lower Manor Estates (designated place)
MacArthur Siding
Manor Estates
Maple Ridge

Namao (designated place, different than the hamlet of the same name)
Namao Ridge Estates
Sturgeon Valley Estates
New Lunnon
Noroncal
North Point
Nywening
Osthoff Estates
Peavey
Pilon Creek Estates
Pinewood Estates
Regency Estates
Reyda Vista Subdivision
Richfield Estates
Riverside Park
Riviere Qui Barre
Rol-Ana Park
Rosal Acres
Shil Shol
Silverchief Subdivision
Skyglen

St. Albert Settlement
Strathcona Heights
Sturgeon
Sturgeon Creek Subdivision
Sturgeon Crest Subdivision
Sturgeon Heights
Sturgeon Valley Vista
Sturgeon View Estates
Summer Brook
Summerbrook Estates
Trestle Ridge
Turfside Park
Upper Manor Estates (designated place)
Upper and Lower Viscount Estates (designated place)
Lower Viscount Estates or Lower Viscount
Upper Viscount Estates or Upper Viscount Estates Subdivision
Volmer
Waterdale Park
Waybrook
Wildlife Park
Woodridge Estates

Other places
Bristol Oakes

Demographics 

The population of Sturgeon County according to its 2020 municipal census is 20,506, a  change from its 2008 municipal census population of 19,165.

In the 2016 Census of Population conducted by Statistics Canada, Sturgeon County had a population of 20,495 living in 6,870 of its 7,337 total private dwellings, a  change from its 2011 population of 19,578.

Economy
Sturgeon County's Economic Development Department is responsible for promoting business. The organization recognizes the benefits that new businesses can bring to the region. It helps businesses navigate municipal programs and processes, provides consultation services, and offers hands-on solutions to assist local actors at every stage of development.

See also 
List of communities in Alberta
List of municipal districts in Alberta

References

External links 

 
Edmonton Metropolitan Region
Municipal districts in Alberta